The 2015–16 Bahraini First Division League (also known as VIVA Bahrain League for sponsorship reasons), was the 59th top-level football season in Bahrain. Fourteen teams participated with Muharraq as the defending champions after securing the championship last season for the thirty-third time.

The league began on 26 October 2015.

Teams 
Bahrain SC and Al-Shabab were relegated at the end of the previous campaign and replaced by Al-Ahli and Sitra. Sitra Club bounced back after one season away from the top flight and Al-Ahli were back after spending 4 years in the second tier.

Stadia and locations 

 Although most clubs do have a stadium, all games are actually played at the National Stadium, Khalifa Sports City Stadium and in Al Ahli Stadium. Games are normally played as back to back headers.

Managerial changes

League table

Season statistics

Goalscorers

Hat-tricks

References

Bahraini Premier League seasons
1
Bah